Two New Sciences! is the second album by Fire Flies, released on May 29, 2007.

Track listing
"Mechanical Love" - 3:11
"Call Me Your Darkness" - 3:13
"They've All Forgotten You" - 3:33
"It's A Party!" - 3:15
"She Sings in Tune" - 3:32
"Worst Man I Can Be" - 3:41
"We're Alive" - 3:53
"Closer to the End" - 3:14
"Rapid Eye Radar" - 3:49
"STOP THE CAR!!!" - 4:03
"The Receiver" - 5:45
"Give Me Time" - 6:18

Personnel
Dan Romer – vocals, synthesizers, keyboards, acoustic guitar
Wil Farr – lead guitar
Matt Krahula – bass guitar
Seth Faulk - drums

Fire Flies albums
Concept albums
2007 albums